Zamboanga del Sur National High School is a public school in Zamboanga del Sur, Philippines, which was established in 1968, is the largest (in terms of student population). It was originally named "Zamboanga del Sur Provincial High School", but was renamed in 1975.

Curricular
1st* Special Science Curriculum (DOST or STEP, SPST)
2 sections per year level

2nd* Special Program in the Arts Curriculum (SPA)
2 sections per year level

3rd* Basic Education Curriculum (BEC)
10-12 sections per year level

4th* Special Program in Sports (SPS)
 2 sections per year level

Official School Publication
 The Reflections English Language Publication
 Busilak Filipino Language Publication

TV appearance
 ABS-CBN Pagadian has made a special segment for Zamboanga del Sur National High school in which every chosen student of the school will be given a chance to report about school.

See also
 Holy Child Academy
 Saint Columban College

References

ZSNHS Online The official website of the Zamboanga del Sur National High School

Schools in Zamboanga del Sur
High schools in the Philippines
Schools in Pagadian